Ozerki is a rural locality (a village) in Staroarzamatovsky Selsoviet, Mishkinsky District, Bashkortostan, Russia. The population was 226 as of 2010. There are 2 streets.

Geography 
Ozerki is located 12 km northeast of Mishkino (the district's administrative centre) by road. Yelyshevo is the nearest rural locality.

References 

Rural localities in Mishkinsky District